Narcissia is a genus of echinoderms belonging to the family Ophidiasteridae.

The species of this genus are found in Africa and America.

Species:

Narcissia ahearnae 
Narcissia canariensis 
Narcissia gracilis 
Narcissia trigonaria

References

Ophidiasteridae
Asteroidea genera